Lone Pine is a census-designated place (CDP) in Inyo County, California, United States. The population was 2,035 at the 2010 census, up from 1,655 at the 2000 census. The town is located in the Owens Valley, near the Alabama Hills and Mount Whitney, between the eastern peaks of the Sierra Nevada to the west and the Inyo Mountains to the east. The local hospital, Southern Inyo Hospital, offers standby emergency services. The town is named  after a solitary pine tree that once existed at the mouth of Lone Pine Canyon. On March 26, 1872, the very large Lone Pine earthquake destroyed most of the town and killed 27 of its 250 to 300 residents.

History
The Paiute Indians inhabited the Owens Valley area from prehistoric times. These early inhabitants are known to have established trading routes which extended to the Pacific Central Coast, delivering materials originating in the Owens Valley to such tribes as the Chumash.

A cabin was built here during the winter of 1861–62. A settlement developed over the following two years. The Lone Pine post office opened in 1870.

On March 26, 1872, at 2:30 am, Lone Pine experienced a violent earthquake that destroyed most of the town. At the time, the town consisted of 80 buildings made of mud and adobe; only 20 structures were left standing. As a result of the quake, which formed Diaz Lake, a total of 26 people lost their lives. A mass grave located just north of town commemorates the site of the main fault. One of the few remaining structures pre-dating the earthquake is the -thick "Old Adobe Wall" located in the alley behind the Lone Star Bistro, a coffee house.

During the 1870s, Lone Pine was an important supply town for several nearby mining communities, including Kearsarge, Cerro Gordo, Keeler, Swansea, and Darwin. The Cerro Gordo mine high in the Inyo Mountains was one of the most productive silver mines in California. To supply the necessary building materials and fuel for these operations, a sawmill was constructed near Horseshoe Meadows by Colonel Sherman Stevens that produced wood for the smelters and the mines.

Railroads played a major role in the development of Lone Pine and the Owens Valley. In 1883, the Carson and Colorado Railway line was constructed from Belleville, Nevada, across the White Mountains to Benton, and then down into the Owens Valley where it ended in Keeler. The arrival of the C&C rail line, with its engine "The Slim Princess", and the stagecoach in Keeler were a major economic boost for the area. Twice a week, passengers arrived on the evening train, spent the night at the Lake View Hotel (later renamed the Hotel Keeler), and then took the stage the following morning to Mojave. A short line to the north connected with the Virginia and Truckee Railroad line at Mound House, Nevada.

In 1920, the history of Lone Pine was dramatically altered when a movie production company came to the Alabama Hills to make the silent film  The Round-Up. Other companies soon discovered the scenic location, and in the coming decades, over 400 films, 100 television episodes, and countless commercials have used Lone Pine and the Alabama Hills as a film location. Notable films shot here in the 1920s and 1930s include Riders of the Purple Sage (1925) with Tom Mix, The Enchanted Hill (1926) with Jack Holt, Somewhere in Sonora (1927) with Ken Maynard, Blue Steel (1934) with John Wayne, Hop-Along Cassidy (1935) with William Boyd, The Charge of the Light Brigade (1936) with Errol Flynn, Oh, Susanna! (1936) with Gene Autry, Rhythm on the Range (1936) with Bing Crosby, The Cowboy and the Lady (1938) with Gary Cooper, Under Western Stars (1938) with Roy Rogers, and Gunga Din (1939) with Cary Grant.

In the coming decades, Lone Pine and the Alabama Hills continued to be used as the setting for Western films, including West of the Pecos (1945) with Robert Mitchum, Thunder Mountain (1947) with Tim Holt, The Gunfighter (1950) with Gregory Peck, The Nevadan (1950) with Randolph Scott, Bad Day at Black Rock (1955) with Spencer Tracy, Hell Bent for Leather (1960) with Audie Murphy, How the West Was Won (1962) with James Stewart, Nevada Smith (1966) with Steve McQueen, Joe Kidd (1972) with Clint Eastwood, Maverick (1994) with Mel Gibson, and The Lone Ranger (2013) with Johnny Depp. Through the years, non-Western films also used the unique landscape of the area, including Alfred Hitchcock's Saboteur (1942) with Robert Cummings, Samson and Delilah (1949) with Hedy Lamarr, Star Trek V: The Final Frontier (1989) with William Shatner, Tremors (1990) with Kevin Bacon, The Postman (1997) with Kevin Costner, and Gladiator (2000) with Russell Crowe.

The most important movie filmed in and around Lone Pine is director Raoul Walsh's High Sierra (1941), starring Humphrey Bogart as Roy Earle in the role that moved Bogart from respected supporting player to leading man. Cast and crew lodged in Lone Pine, and Walsh shot various scenes in and around Lone Pine. For the film's mountain chase scenes, Walsh took everyone to nearby Mt. Whitney, where pack mules lugged camera equipment up the mountainside: "filming began just outside Lone Pine ... on August 5, 1940. ... On a slope at the side of Mt. Whitney, ... a group of twenty men from the studio worked for four days to clear a path so that mountain-trained mules, packing cameras and other equipment, could get up to the shooting area.  ... Bogart had to run three miles up a mountainside for two days ... Walsh ordered all the big boulders removed from the path of [Bogart's] final fall, but the little ones remained, and Bogart complained about that plenty ... Bogie especially did not want to trek up that mountain. This was the shoot on which Walsh gave him the nickname 'Bogey the Beefer'". John Huston wrote the screenplay, and Ida Lupino co-starred.

Following the Japanese attack on Pearl Harbor, on December 7, 1941, President Roosevelt signed an executive order that required people of Japanese ancestry living along the Pacific coast to be placed into relocation camps.

Geography

Lone Pine is situated in the Owens Valley with the picturesque Alabama Hills lying to the west. Their unique appearance has attracted many film companies over the years. The hills were named in 1862 by Southern sympathisers, commemorating the victories of the Confederate ship CSS Alabama.

As the crow flies, Lone Pine is  due east of Fresno. However, there is no road crossing the Sierra Nevada to provide access from Lone Pine to Fresno.

Climate

Lone Pine and most of the Owens Valley have a cold desert climate (Köppen climate classification: BWk) characterised by hot summers and cold winters. January temperatures range from the middle fifties °F (+12℃–+15℃) to the upper twenties °F (-4℃–-1℃) and July temperatures range from the upper nineties °F (35℃–37℃) to the lower sixties °F (15℃–18℃). Snowfall varies greatly from year-to-year, averaging only  annually. The nearest official National Weather Service co-operative weather station is in Independence where records date back to 1893. The National Weather Service has added an automated weather station in Lone Pine, which provides observations on its website, weather.gov.

Demographics

2010
The 2010 United States Census reported that Lone Pine had a population of 2,035. The racial makeup of Lone Pine was 1,334 (65.6%) White, 6 (0.3%) Black, 205 (10.1%) Native American, 17 (0.8%) Asian, 1 (0.0%) Pacific Islander, 376 (18.5%) from other races, and 96 (4.7%) from two or more races. Hispanic or Latino of any race were 694 persons (34.1%).

The Census reported that 1,972 people (96.9% of the population) lived in households, 0 (0%) lived in non-institutionalised group quarters, and 63 (3.1%) were institutionalised.

There were 831 households, out of which 254 (30.6%) had children under the age of 18 living in them, 374 (45.0%) were opposite-sex married couples living together, 95 (11.4%) had a female householder with no husband present, 46 (5.5%) had a male householder with no wife present. There were 53 (6.4%) unmarried opposite-sex partnerships, and 5 (0.6%) same-sex married couples or partnerships. 276 households (33.2%) were made up of individuals, and 107 (12.9%) had someone living alone who was 65 years of age or older. The average household size was 2.37.  There were 515 families (62.0% of all households); the average family size was 3.04.

The population was spread out, with 492 people (24.2%) under the age of 18, 136 people (6.7%) aged 18 to 24, 442 people (21.7%) aged 25 to 44, 580 people (28.5%) aged 45 to 64, and 385 people (18.9%) who were 65 years of age or older. The median age was 41.9 years. For every 100 females, there were 98.5 males.  For every 100 females age 18 and over, there were 96.1 males.

The homeowner vacancy rate was 2.6%; the rental vacancy rate was 7.1%. 1,030 people (50.6% of the population) lived in owner-occupied housing units and 942 people (46.3%) lived in rental housing units.

2000
As of the census of 2000, there were 1,655 people, 709 households, and 448 families residing in the CDP. The racial makeup of the CDP was 83.2% White, 0.1% Black or African American, 2.7% Native American, 1.0% Asian, 0.1% Pacific Islander, 8.1% from other races, and 4.9% from two or more races. 26.8% of the population were Hispanic or Latino of any race.

There were 709 households, out of which 29.6% had children under the age of 18 living with them, 48.4% were married couples living together, 10.9% had a female householder with no husband present, and 36.8% were non-families. 32.0% of all households were made up of individuals, and 15.1% had someone living alone who was 65 years of age or older. The average household size was 2.29 and the average family size was 2.88.

In the CDP, the population was spread out, with 24.6% under the age of 18, 6.9% from 18 to 24, 22.5% from 25 to 44, 25.8% from 45 to 64, and 20.2% who were 65 years of age or older. The median age was 43 years. For every 100 females, there were 90.9 males. For every 100 females age 18 and over, there were 89.7 males.

The median income for a household in the CDP was $29,079, and the median income for a family was $35,800. Males had a median income of $30,813 versus $22,778 for females. The per capita income for the CDP was $16,262. About 16.5% of families and 20.6% of the population were below the poverty line, including 30.9% of those under age 18 and 9.3% of those age 65 or over.

Lone Pine Indian Reservation
The Lone Pine Indian Reservation is home to Owens Valley Paiute and Shoshone members of the federally recognized tribe, the Paiute-Shoshone Indians of the Lone Pine Community of the Lone Pine Reservation. The tribe traditionally lived in sedentary villages in the valley due to the suitable climate and abundant food supply. These people have been living here for several thousands of years. The reservation is along the south side of town on both sides of US395.

Tourism

The town is home to an Interagency Visitor Center at SR136 and US395.

Much of the local economy is based on tourism, as the town is between several major tourist destinations, such as Mount Whitney, Sequoia National Park, Kings Canyon National Park, Mammoth Mountain, Death Valley National Park, and Yosemite National Park; many motels line the main road through town.

Manzanar National Historic Site
The Manzanar National Historic Site (formerly the Manzanar War Relocation Center), a Japanese American internment camp during World War II, is located on Highway 395 north of Lone Pine and south of Independence. Manzanar (which means "apple orchard" in Spanish) is the most infamous of the 10 camps in which Japanese Americans, both citizens (including natural-born Americans) and resident aliens, were encamped during World War II.  Manzanar has been identified as the best preserved of these camps by the United States National Park Service which maintains and is restoring the site as a U.S. National Historic Site.

Sierra Nevada
The Sierra Nevada range and the Inyo Mountains dominate the views from the town.

Film history at Lone Pine

The Lone Pine Film History Museum, supported by Beverly and Jim Rogers, highlights the area's frequent appearances in Hollywood feature films. The Alabama Hills west of town are frequently used as a filming location for Western movies. Since the early years of filmmaking, directors and their production units have used the Lone Pine area to represent the iconic American West. Approaching the 100th anniversary of The Roundup (1920), the first documented film produced in the area, Lone Pine has played host to hundreds of the industry's best-known directors and actors, among them directors William Wyler, John Ford, George Stevens, and William Wellman, and actors John Wayne, Bing Crosby, Gene Autry, Clint Eastwood,  Barbara Stanwyck, and Jeff Bridges. The Whitney Portal road was used in the film High Sierra (1941) with Humphrey Bogart, which culminated with a shoot-out between Bogart's character and the police, at the foot of Mount Whitney. The classic Bad Day at Black Rock (1955), starring Spencer Tracy, Robert Ryan and Anne Francis, was also filmed in and around the Lone Pine area. Lone Pine is also the location of several scenes in Iron Man (2008), depicting Afghanistan, and in the Godzilla (2014) remake, as a temporary military forward operating base ("FOB").

Barbara Stanwyck in accordance with her wishes had her cremated remains and ashes scattered from a helicopter over Lone Pine, California, where she had made some of her western films.

The Forum Theater is a theater-cafe that hosts live music, theater, and films at weekends. The Lone Pine Film Festival has been held every year since 1989 to celebrate the rich heritage that filmmakers have brought to the area over the years.

The Alabama Hills Recreation Area is directed by the Bureau of Land Management for public recreation.

Events
From 1971 through 1981, Lone Pine was the site of the annual Lone Pine International Chess tournament. Winners of the Lone Pine tournament included world champion Tigran Petrosian, world championship finalist Viktor Korchnoi, and U.S. champions Arthur Bisguier, Walter Browne, and Larry Evans.

Government

Transportation 

The community is located on U.S. Route 395, north of State Route 136. Owens Dry Lake is just over six miles (10 km) south of town on US 395.

Public transportation is provided by Eastern Sierra Transit Authority

Education 
Lone Pine has one high school, Lone Pine High School. It is located at the south end of town along Highway 395. Lo-Inyo elementary school is located at the north end of town, just off 395.

See also
 Inyo National Forest
 Los Angeles Aqueduct
 Manzanar, California
 Mount Whitney

References

External links

Lone Pine Chamber of Commerce
BLM Alabama Hills Recreation Area website
Lone Pine Film History Museum
NPS Manzanar National Historic Site website
Lone Pine Gem and Mineral Society website

Owens Valley
Census-designated places in Inyo County, California
Census-designated places in California
Populated places in the Mojave Desert
History of the Mojave Desert region